Egil Jacobsen (1897 – 27 March 1923) was a Danish chess master.

He tied for 5-6th at Horsens 1915 (the 6th Danish Chess Championship, Johannes Giersing won), tied for 9-10th at Copenhagen 1916 (the 9th Nordic Chess Championship, B-tournament, Karl Berndtsson won), and twice won Danish championships at Grenaa 1917 and Copenhagen 1922. He took 5th at Copenhagen 1923 (Aron Nimzowitsch won), and shared 2nd, behind Erik Andersen, at Copenhagen 1923 (DEN-ch).

References

External links
 (chessgames.com misattributes some 1928 Chess Olympiad games to Egil Jacobsen that were probably played by Ernst Jacobsen instead)
Egil Jacobsen at 365Chess.com

1897 births
1923 deaths
Danish chess players
20th-century chess players